This race was held on January 31, 2010 as the main and closing event of the 2010 UCI Cyclo-cross World Championships in Tábor, Czech Republic. Zdeněk Štybar got his first title in the Men's Elite category. The length of the course was 28.06 km (0.16 km + 9 laps of 3.10 km each).

Ranking

References

External links
 Union Cycliste Internationale
 

Men's elite race
UCI Cyclo-cross World Championships – Men's elite race
2010 in cyclo-cross